Red Hill is an unincorporated community in Mitchell County, North Carolina, United States.

History
The community of Red Hill was named for a family that over-farmed one of its hillsides; after heavy rains the topsoil washed-away, all that was left was a "red hill." The Red Hill Post Office operated 1853–1911; during 1894–1911, the community was spelled "Redhill." In 1902, the South & Western Railroad established rail service that connected Red Hill between Spruce Pine and Lost Cove, Tennessee. Over the years, the rail line had expanded and changed ownership; the current successor is CSX, which continues rail service through the area.

Further reading
 Whitson, K.B. and S.R. Red Hill: The Untold Story of the Whitson Brothers and the Murder of Kit Byrd September 5, 2007 .

References

Unincorporated communities in Mitchell County, North Carolina
Unincorporated communities in North Carolina